Osteochilus kahajanensis is a species of cyprinid fish endemic to the southern tip of the Malay Peninsula.

Named after the Kahajan River, Borneo, the type locality.

References

Taxa named by Pieter Bleeker
Fish described in 1856
Osteochilus